Ian James Brayshaw (born 14 January 1942) is a former Australian sportsman. He played both Australian rules football and cricket. Both his sons, Mark Brayshaw and James Brayshaw, were noted athletes in their respective sports, and three of his grandsons have been members of AFL squads.

Football career 

Cricket career 
A right-handed all-rounder, Brayshaw played over 100 first-class games for Western Australia, and he captained the side on several occasions. Against Victoria during the 1967–68 Sheffield Shield season, he accomplished one of cricket's rarest feats, taking ten wickets in an innings. He was the most recent Australian to do so as of August 2022.

Media career 
Brayshaw later worked in the media with ABC and Channel Ten in Western Australia. He was the expert commentator on ABC Radio when Trevor Chappell bowled the infamous underarm ball during a one-day match between Australia and New Zealand.

Books 
Brayshaw has co-authored several sporting books, including The ABC of Cricket; The Black Pearl: No Regrets; Caught Marsh, Bowled Lillee: The Legend Lives On; The Elements of Cricket; and Round The Wicket: A Selection of Cricket Stories. In 2021, he self-published his first novel, a romance novel entitled Terms of Repayment.

Family 
Brayshaw is the father of James Brayshaw, a former state cricketer with Western Australia and South Australia, media personality on Seven Network, and former chairman of the North Melbourne Football Club; and Mark Brayshaw, a former Claremont and North Melbourne footballer. Mark's sons Angus, Andrew and Hamish have all been on AFL squads, with the latter being delisted at the end of the 2020 AFL season.

In an accident on 20 September 2006, his 36-year-old daughter Sally was killed instantly after the facade of her garage collapsed on top of her.

References

External links

Australian rules football commentators
Western Australia cricketers
Claremont Football Club players
1942 births
Living people
Australian rules footballers from Perth, Western Australia
Australian cricketers
Cricketers from Perth, Western Australia
Cricketers who have taken ten wickets in an innings
People educated at Scotch College, Perth